Christian Frederick Bayoi Makoun Reyes (born 5 March 2000) is a Venezuelan professional footballer who plays as both a defensive midfielder and defender for MLS club New England Revolution.

International career
Makoun was called up to the Venezuela under-20 side for the 2017 FIFA U-20 World Cup.

Personal life 
His father Christian Makoun, was youth International footballer for Cameroon and played during his career, for Caïman Douala, Peruvian side Deportivo Pesquero, Argentinian Club Atlético Huracán, Latvian FC Jūrmala, Azerbaijani based club FK Genclerbirliyi Sumqayit and Belgium based clubs Cercle Brugge K.S.V. and K.F.C. Rhodienne-De Hoek. He also holds Belgian citizenship through his Belgian-based Cameroonian father.

Career statistics

Club

Honours 

Zamora
 Copa Venezuela: 2019

Venezuela U20
 FIFA U-20 World Cup: Runner-up 2017

References

External links

2000 births
Living people
Venezuelan footballers
Venezuelan expatriate footballers
Venezuelan expatriate sportspeople in Italy
Expatriate footballers in Italy
Association football midfielders
Venezuelan Primera División players
Zamora FC players
Juventus F.C. players
Juventus Next Gen players
Inter Miami CF players
Inter Miami CF II players
Charlotte FC players
New England Revolution players
Venezuelan people of Cameroonian descent
Venezuela youth international footballers
Venezuela under-20 international footballers
Naturalised citizens of Belgium
Major League Soccer players
USL League One players
People from Valencia, Venezuela
Venezuela international footballers
Belgian people of Cameroonian descent
21st-century Venezuelan people